Rancho Mission Viejo (Spanish: Rancho Misión Vieja, meaning "Old Mission Ranch") is an active  ranch and farm, habitat reserve, residential community, and census-designated place in South Orange County, California. Rancho Mission Viejo originated as a series of land grants to John Forster in 1845. The remaining part of Rancho Mission Viejo consists of a nearly  nature reserve (The Reserve at Rancho Mission Viejo) and multiple residential communities slated to open in phases between 2010 and 2030. As of the 2020 census, it had a population of 10,378.

History
Prior to the founding of the ranch, the land was the site of Acjachemen village of Piwiva. The ranch was established in 1845 when John (Don Juan) Forster acquired Rancho La Paz and Mission San Juan Capistrano. Forster added these properties to Rancho Trabuco, which he had purchased in 1843. Forster's brother-in-law was Pío Pico, governor of then-Mexican-held California.

After Forster died in 1882, Irish immigrants Richard O'Neill Sr. and James Flood acquired the ranch, taking equal ownership of the Rancho Santa Margarita y las Flores, Rancho Mission Viejo and Rancho Trabuco lands. Flood provided the money to purchase the ranches; O'Neill, offering his skills as a cattleman as sweat equity, agreed to work out his half as resident manager. Under O'Neill, the cattle herd was expanded, the land was improved, row crops were introduced, and the ranch became Orange County's largest producer of wheat.

In 1907, James L. Flood, son of the original owner, made good on his late father's promise and conveyed an undivided half interest to O'Neill Sr. Four months later, declining health caused O'Neill to deed his interest to his son, Jerome. In 1923, the sons of Flood and O'Neill consolidated their partnership with the Santa Margarita Company. Shortly thereafter, both men died.

The Santa Margarita Co. was dissolved in 1939 when the ranch was split in two. Richard O'Neill Jr. retained the portion of the ranch located in Orange County (Rancho Mission Viejo and Rancho Trabuco) and the Flood family took the Rancho Santa Margarita y las Flores property in San Diego County. After the war, what remained of the historic Ranch now encompassed two Orange County parcels, united under the name Rancho Mission Viejo, and totaling .

O'Neill died in 1943 and his widow, Marguerite, led the family and kept the family business intact. In June 1950, with the establishment of the  O'Neill Regional Park, the O'Neill family made the first of thousands of acres of open space dedications to Orange County.

As of 2017, the Sendero village and the Gavilan senior housing developments have been completed. The larger Esencia village is currently under construction with a K-8 school to be opened in fall of 2018. Sendero Marketplace, a shopping center built as part of the community, has also been completed.

Residential development
In 1963, the O'Neill family and its partners established the Mission Viejo Company and embarked on its first residential development, the  planned community of Mission Viejo. Marguerite had three grandsons, Anthony Moiso, Jerome Moiso, and Douglas Avery. The oldest, Anthony "Tony" Moiso, newly graduated from college and fresh out of the U.S. Army, took over operations.

In 1972, Mission Viejo Co. and its remaining undeveloped area in Mission Viejo were sold to Philip Morris. The Mission Viejo Company was acquired by Shea Properties in August 1997. After the initial sale, Moiso began managing the remaining  of Rancho Mission Viejo, while his brothers Jerome Moiso and Douglas Avery continued to oversee operations as owners.

Rancho Mission Viejo is today home to four master-planned communities: the City of Mission Viejo, City of Rancho Santa Margarita, Las Flores, and Ladera Ranch. In 2000, the O’Neill/Avery/Moiso family created a comprehensive open space preservation and land use plan for the remaining 23,000 acres of Rancho Mission Viejo.  In 2004, the Ranch Plan was approved by the Orange County Board of Supervisors. That plan has resulted in the creation of The Reserve at Rancho Mission Viejo (a nearly 17,000-acre habitat reserve on the Ranch) and the plan for a new community called Rancho Mission Viejo., which celebrated its grand opening in 2013 with the debut of its first community called Sendero.  In Fall 2015, the new community of Esencia celebrated the grand opening of its first 12 neighborhoods as well as host of community amenities.

In May 2019, the Reata Glen senior living community opened in Rancho Mission Viejo and received its first residents. It is described in the typology of the architectural specifications as a 55+  independent living/assisted living/memory care/skilled nursing life plan community (CCRC).

Demographics

2020 
The 2020 United States Census reported that Rancho Mission Viejo had a population of 10,378. The racial makeup of Rancho Mission Viejo was 75.1% White, 1.4% African American, 11.7% Asian, and 8.5% Hispanic or Latino of any race.

References

External links 
 
 
 
 OC register article on the 2012 development
 
 

Mission Viejo
Mission Viejo
Census-designated places in Orange County, California
Census-designated places in California